George Allen Gilreath (September 26, 1834 – July 3, 1863) was a Confederate soldier who commanded the North Carolina 55th Regiment during Pickett's Charge at the Battle of Gettysburg. He was killed during the charge, which became known as the high-water mark of the Confederacy.

Early years
Gilreath was born in Wilkes County, North Carolina, on September 26, 1834, to Noah Gilreath Sr. and Elizabeth Allen of Wilkes County. He grew up on a  family plantation where his grandfather Alexander Gilreath had settled in 1776. His grandfather, a Revolutionary War Veteran of the Wilkes County Regiment, operated a grist mill and blacksmith shop and served as tax collector, constable, justice of the peace, postmaster, and school board member. The plantation retained about a dozen slaves worked the land.

In his early 20s, Gilreath left North Carolina and bought land in Hempsted County, Arkansas. On July 30, 1857, he married Lurana Gilbert but when his wife and young child died, he came back to Wilkes County.

Civil War
On March 1, 1862, at age 27, Gilreath volunteered at Wilkesboro, North Carolina, into Company B, 55th N.C. Troops, as a 2nd Lieutenant. The 55th was part of Davis's Brigade, Pettigrew's Division. He was promoted to 1st Lieutenant on May 19.  On September 15, 1862, he was promoted to Captain after Captain Forester resigned as commander of the Wilkes County Company.  

The following year, at the climax of the Battle of Gettysburg, General Robert E. Lee ordered Major General George Pickett to punch a hole in the center of the Federal Army, then attack the right and left flanks. Fifteen regiments of Tar Heels, including the 55th N.C., were part of the 12,500-man force selected to participate in the attack. Many of the field and staff officers of the 55th N.C. were killed or wounded in the first two days of fighting. On the third day of fighting, the 55th was put under the command of senior Captain Gilreath. On July 3 at 1:00 pm the artillery barrage from 140 Confederate cannons started, and at 3:00 pm, the Confederates formed a battle line to march across a mile of open field to a stone wall on Cemetery Ridge that was protecting Union troops. Although most of the Confederates failed to make it to the stone wall several members of the 55th made it to the wall and beyond.

Gilreath was killed in the charge. The Army of Northern Virginia retreated in the rain on July 4, leaving Gettysburg for Virginia. It is believed that Gilreath was left on the battlefield.

References

High Tide at Gettysburg by Glenn Tucker 1958
Pickett's Charge Eyewitness Accounts  by Richard Rollins 1994 
Histories of the Several Regiments and Battalions for North Carolina in the Great War 1861-'65 Vol. III Walter Clark 1901 page 296-299
North Carolina Troops 1861-1865 A Roster Vol. XIII Compiled by Weymouth T. Jordan Jr.
Military Records: National Archives, Washington, DC
Newspaper Archives: North Carolina Standard
The 55th North Carolina in the Civil War by Jeffrey M. Girvan, McFarland & Company 2006 
Our State; North Carolina Magazine, July 2008 Issue: Extraordinary Valor; On this 145th anniversary of the Battle of Gettysburg, we remember the heroism of three Tar Heel regiments: by Alan Hodge

1834 births
1863 deaths
Confederate States Army officers
People of North Carolina in the American Civil War
Confederate States of America military personnel killed in the American Civil War